Lake Park High School is a four-year public high school occupying two campuses, both located in Roselle, Illinois, a western suburb of Chicago. Freshmen and sophomores attend the East Campus (the original campus built in 1956), located near Medinah, and juniors and seniors attend the West Campus. It is part of the Lake Park Community High School District 108. Students from Roselle, Medinah, Bloomingdale, Itasca, Wood Dale, Keeneyville, and Hanover Park attend the school.

History
The name "Lake Park" is derived from the campuses being between "Lake" Street and Irving "Park" Road. The citizens of northwestern DuPage County, Illinois founded Lake Park High School District 108 in 1953, and the doors opened at what is now East Campus, 600 South Medinah Road, Roselle, in September 1956 to 320 students. In less than twenty years, the number of students had increased substantially and West Campus was built in 1975. The east campus borders the Medinah Country Club.

Athletics
Lake Park has 28 athletic teams, of which there are 13 boys, 11 girls teams and 4 co-ed teams that compete in the DuKane Conference and Illinois High School Association.

Boys
 Baseball
 Basketball
 Bowling
 Cheerleading
 Cross country
 Football
 Golf
 Gymnastics
 Soccer
 Swim & Dive
 Tennis
 Track
 Volleyball
 Wrestling
Girl
 Badminton
 Basketball
 Bowling
 Cheerleading
 Cross Country
 Diving
 Golf
 Gymnastics
 Lancettes
 Soccer
 Softball
 Swim & Dive
 Tennis
 Track
 Volleyball

State titles
Boys Track – 1997, 2010-13.
Girls Bowling – 1986–87 and 1994–95
Boys Bowling – 2008–2009
Cheerleading (Coed) 2011

Exchanges
Lake Park has an exchange program with Helene-Lange-Gymnasium in Hamburg, Germany, allowing students to experience each other's culture and lifestyle.

Notable alumni
Mike Catalano, class of 2014, former professional soccer player
Mike DiNunno, did not graduate, professional basketball player
Tim Ehrhardt, class of 2013, professional decathlete
Lindsay Flanagan, class of 2009, professional long distance runner and silver medalist at the 2015 Pan American Games
Mark Gorski, class of 1978, Olympic gold medalist (track cycling Individual sprint, 1984 Summer Olympics)
Keith Hackney, class of 1976,  mixed martial arts fighter.
Scott Kellar, class of 1982,  football player
Glenn Kotche, class of 1989, drummer for the band Wilco, Grammy Award winner (2005)
Camden Murphy, class of 2014, NASCAR and Monster Jam driver
Diane Pappas, class of 1990, former Democratic member of the Illinois House of Representatives
Tony Randazzo, class of 1983, MLB umpire
Angela Rose, class of 1996, activist and founder of the nonprofit PAVE: Promoting Awareness, Victim Empowerment
Duncan Rouleau, class of 1982,  comic book writer and artist
Don Schulze, class of 1980,  Major League Baseball player (Chicago Cubs, Cleveland Indians, Japan League)
Rodney A. Smolla, class of 1971, Dean of the Widener University School of Law
Robert Shallcross, class of 1976, screenwriter and director of movies such as "Uncle Nino" (2003) "Bored Silly" (2000) and writer "Little Giants" (1994)
Perrion Winfrey, class of 2018, football player
Sarah Zelenka, class of 2005, rower at the 2012 Summer Olympics
Zach Ziemek, class of 2011, decathlete at the 2015 World Championships in Athletics

References

External links
 Official website

Public high schools in Illinois
Roselle, Illinois
Bloomingdale, Illinois
School districts in DuPage County, Illinois
Schools in DuPage County, Illinois
Educational institutions established in 1956
1956 establishments in Illinois